Rowyco is the eighth studio album by American southern rock band Jackyl.  Released on 5 August 2016, the album was published via Mighty Loud Records.

Track listing

Charts

References 

2016 albums
Jackyl albums